Wetaskiwin Regional Airport  is located within the city of Wetaskiwin, Alberta, Canada.

References

External links
Place to Fly on COPA's Places to Fly airport directory

Certified airports in Alberta
Wetaskiwin